The 2008 Copa Indonesia Final was a football match that took place on 13 January 2008 at Gelora Bung Karno Stadium in Jakarta. It was the third final of Piala Indonesia and contested by Sriwijaya FC and Persipura Jayapura. It was a first-ever final appearance for Sriwijaya, while Persipura made it back-to-back final appearances after losing to Arema in the previous edition.

Sriwijaya won the title via a penalty shoot-out after the match ended 1–1 in extra time. As winners, Sriwijaya entered the qualifying play-off of the 2009 AFC Champions League.

Road to the final

Note: In all results below, the score of the finalist is given first (H: home; A: away).

Match details

See also
2007–08 Copa Indonesia

References

External links
Official site Liga Indonesia

2007
2007–08 in Indonesian football